This is a list of compositions by composer Alfred Schnittke.

Orchestral

Symphonies

Symphony No. 0 (1956–57)
Symphony No. 1 (1969–74)
Symphony No. 2 "St. Florian" (1979)
Symphony No. 3 (1981)
Symphony No. 4 (1983)
Symphony No. 5 [Concerto Grosso No. 4] (1988)
Symphony No. 6 (1992)
Symphony No. 7 (1993)
Symphony No. 8 (1994)
Symphony No. 9 (1996–97; reconstructed by Alexander Raskatov)

Other orchestral

Pianissimo (1968)
In Memoriam... (1977–78) (orchestral version of the Piano Quintet)
Passacaglia (1979–80)
Gogol Suite (Suite from The Census List) (1980)
Ritual (1984–85)
(K)ein Sommernachtstraum (1985)
Symphonic Prelude (1994)
For Liverpool (1994)

Concertos and concertante pieces

Violin and orchestra

Concerto No. 1 for violin and orchestra (1957, revised 1963)
Concerto No. 2 for violin and chamber orchestra (1966)
Concerto No. 3 for violin and chamber orchestra (1978)
Concerto No. 4 for violin and orchestra (1984)

Piano and orchestra

Poème for piano and orchestra (1953)
Concerto for piano and orchestra (1960)
Music for piano and chamber orchestra (1964)
Concerto for Piano and String Orchestra (1979)
Concerto for piano four hands and chamber orchestra (1988) "to Viktoria Postnikova and Irina Schnittke"

Cello and orchestra

Concerto No. 1 for cello and orchestra (1985/1986)
Concerto No. 2 for cello and orchestra (1990) "to M.Rostropovich"

Viola and orchestra

Concerto for viola and orchestra (1985)
Monologue for viola and strings (1989)
Concerto for viola and small orchestra (1997)

Other instruments and orchestra

Accordion Concerto (1949), lost work
Double Concerto for oboe, harp, and string orchestra (Lento) "to Heinz Holliger, Ursula Holliger and the Zagreb Soloists" (1971)
Concerto Grosso No. 1 for two violins, prepared piano, harpsichord and 21 strings (1977)
Moz-Art à la Haydn for two violins and string orchestra (1977)
Concerto Grosso No. 1 for flute, oboe, harpsichord, prepared piano and string orchestra (1988 version)
Concerto Grosso No. 2 for violin, cello and triple symphony orchestra (1981–1982)
Concerto Grosso No. 3 for two violins, harpsichord, celesta, piano and 14 strings (1985)
Concerto Grosso No. 4 [Symphony No. 5] for violin, oboe, harpsichord and orchestra (1988)
Concerto Grosso No. 5 for violin, [offstage] piano and orchestra (1990–1991)
Concerto Grosso No. 6 for piano, violin and string orchestra (1993)
Triple Concerto for violin, viola, cello and string orchestra "Concerto for Three" (1994)
Five Fragments to Pictures of Hieronymus Bosch for tenor, violin, trombone, harpsichord, timpani and string orchestra (On texts by Aeschylus) "to Vladimir Spivakov" (1994)

Choral music

 Nagasaki, oratorio (1958)
 Songs of War and Peace, cantata
 Voices of Nature (1972)
 Requiem (1974–75)
 Minnesang for 52 voices (1981)
 Seid nüchtern und wachet... (Faust Cantata) (1983)
 Three Sacred Hymns (1983–84)
 Concerto for mixed chorus (1984–85)
 Psalms of Repentance (1988)

Chamber music

Sonata No. 1 for violin and piano (1963; orchestrated, 1968)
Dialogue for cello and 7 instruments (1965)
String Quartet No. 1 (1966)
Serenade for violin, clarinet, double-bass, piano and percussion (1968)
Sonata No. 2 for violin and piano "Quasi una sonata" (1968; orchestrated, 1987)
Canon in Memoriam Igor Stravinsky for string quartet (1971)
Suite in the Old Style for violin and piano or harpsichord (1972)
Gratulationsrondo for violin and piano (1973)
Hymn I for cello, harp and timpani (1974)
Hymn II for cello and double-bass (1974)
Hymn III for cello, bassoon, harpsichord and bells or timpani (1974)
Hymn IV for cello, bassoon, double-bass, harpsichord, harp, timpani and bells (1974–1979)
Prelude in Memoriam Dmitri Shostakovich for 2 violins (1975)
Cantus Perpetuus for keyboard instrument and percussion (1975)
Piano Quintet (1972–76)
Stille Nacht, arr. for violin and piano (1978)
Sonata No. 1 for cello and piano (1978)
Stille Musik for violin and cello (1979)
Hommage to Stravinsky, Prokofiev and Shostakovich for piano six hands (1979) [Based on "Chinese March" from The Nightingale, Humoresque Scherzo and Polka from The Golden Age.]
Three Madrigals for soprano, violin, viola, double bass, vibraphone, and harpsichord
String Quartet No. 2 (1981)
Septet for flute, two clarinets, violin, viola, cello and harpsichord or organ (1981–1982)

String Quartet No. 3 (1983)
Sound and Echo for trombone and organ (1983)
String Trio (1985, also arranged as Piano Trio, 1992) – shares a theme with the Cello Concerto No. 1 from 1986
Quartet for piano and strings (1988)
String Quartet No. 4 (1989)
Madrigal in Memoriam Oleg Kagan for solo violin or cello (1990)
Musica nostalgica for cello and piano (1992)
Peer Gynt: Epiloque for cello, piano and tape (1993)
Sonata No. 2 for cello and piano (1994)
Sonata No. 3 for violin and piano (1994)
Variations for string quartet (1997)

Solo instrumental

Fuga for solo violin (1953)
Six Preludes for piano (1953–1954)
Variations for piano (1954–1955)
Improvisation and Fugue for piano (1965)
Variations on one chord for piano (1965)
Potok (Stream), electronic composition (1969)
Eight Pieces for piano (1971) Dedicated to his son Andrei
Cadenza to Mozart's Piano Concerto in C minor, K. 491 (first movement) (1975)
Two Cadenzas to Beethoven's Violin Concerto in D major, Op. 61 for solo violin, 10 violins and timpani (1975–1977)
Two Short Pieces for organ (1980)
Cadenzas to Mozart's Piano Concerto in C, K. 467 (first and second movements) (1980)
A Paganini for solo violin (1982)
Cadenza to Mozart's Piano Concerto in C major, K. 503 (first movement) (1983)
Two Cadenzas to Mozart's Bassoon Concerto in B major, K. 191 (1983)
Piano Sonata No. 1 (1987–88)
Klingende Buchstaben for solo cello (1988)
Madrigal in Memoriam Oleg Kagan, first version for violin solo (1990)
Madrigal in Memoriam Oleg Kagan, second version for cello solo (1990)
Three Fragments for harpsichord (1990)
Five Aphorisms for piano (1990)
Piano Sonata No. 2 (1990)
Cadenzas to Mozart's Piano Concerto in B major, K. 39 (first and third movements) (1990)
For the 90th Birthday of Alfred Schlee for viola solo (1991)
Piano Sonata No. 3 (1992)
Improvisation for solo cello (1993)
Sonatina for piano four hands (1995)

Operas

Life with an Idiot, opera in 2 acts, libretto by Viktor Yerofeyev (1992)
Historia von D. Johann Fausten, opera in 3 acts and an epilogue, libretto by Jörg Morgener (Jürgen Köchel) and Alfred Schnittke (1991–1994)
Gesualdo, opera in 7 tableaux, a prologue and an epilogue, libretto by Richard Bletschacher (1993)

Ballets

Labyrinths, ballet in five episodes, libretto by Vladimir Vasilyev. (1971)
Der Gelbe Klang (The Yellow Sound), ballet suite, libretto by Wassily Kandinsky. (1973)
Sketches, ballet in one act. “Choreographic fantasia” by Andrey Petrov after the themes by Nikolai Gogol. (1985)
Peer Gynt, ballet in three acts by John Neumeier based on Henrik Ibsen’s drama (1988)

Soundtracks

Adventures of a Dentist, film directed by Elem Klimov (1965, material reused in Suite in the Old Style and Symphony No. 1)
Commissar, film directed by Aleksandr Askoldov (1967, released 1988), based on one of Vasily Grossman's first short stories, "In the Town of Berdichev"
, animated film directed by Andrei Khrzhanovsky (1968, much material reused in second violin sonata)
The Seagull, film directed by Youli Karassik (1970)
Belorussian Station, film directed by Andrei Smirnov (1970)
Sport, Sport, Sport, film directed by Elem Klimov (1971)
You and I, film directed by Larisa Shepitko (1971)
Butterfly, animated film directed by Andrei Khrzhanovsky (1973)
My Past and Thoughts, TV Movie (1973)
Agony, two-part film directed by Elem Klimov (1974, main theme reused in the finale of the Second Cello Concerto)
Rikki-Tikki-Tavi, live action film directed by Aleksandr Zguridi and Nana Kldiashvili (1975)
Clowns and Children (Clowns und Kinder), short film directed by Alexander Mitta (1976)
How Czar Peter the Great Married Off His Moor, film directed by Alexander Mitta (1976) 
The Ascent, film directed by Larisa Shepitko (1977)
The Story of an Unknown Actor, film directed by Aleksandr Zarkhi (1977)
Father Sergius (1978)
Little Tragedies, three-part TV film directed by Mikhail Schweitzer (1979)
Air Crew, film directed by Alexander Mitta (1979)
The Story of Voyages, also known as The Fairytale of the Wanderings, film directed by Alexander Mitta (1982)
Dead Souls, five-part TV miniseries directed by Mikhail Shveytser (1984)
The Last Days of St. Petersburg (1992, new score for 1927 film, co-written with the composer's son Andrey)
The Master and Margarita, film directed by Yuri Kara (1994)

References

Notes 

Schnittke